USS Francovich (APD-116) was a United States Navy  in commission from 1945 to 1946. She was sold for srap in 1965.

Namesake
Albert Anthony Francovich was born on 23 January 1920, at Shamokin, Pennsylvania into a Croatian-American family.  He enlisted in the U.S. Navy on 8 March 1939. As an aviation machinists mate first class with a patrol squadron during the Solomon Islands campaign, Francovich was killed in action in an engagement with a Japanese four-engined flying boat on 6 September 1942. Francovich posthumously was awarded the Navy Cross for his heroism in standing to his gun although mortally wounded.

The U.S. Navy destroyer escort  was named for him but when the destroyer escorts construction was cancelled in 1944 prior to completion, the name was transferred to the  USS Francovich (DE-606).

Construction and commissioning
USS Francovich (DE-606) was laid down on 19 April 1945 by Bethlehem-Hingham Shipyard at Hingham, Massachusetts. She was launched on 5 June 1945, sponsored by Mrs. Mary F. Edmunds, Francovich's sister. Francovich was re-classified as a Crosley-class high speed transport and redesignated APD-116 on 17 July 1945. She was commissioned on 6 September 1945.

Service history
After her shakedown training, Francovich, commissioned too late to see service during World War II, arrived at Green Cove Springs, Florida, on 18 November 1945 to give assistance in the post-World War II inactivation of ships being readied for reserve there.

Decommissioning and disposal
Francovich was decommissioned on 29 April 1946 and herself placed in reserve at Green Cove Springs.  She was stricken from the Naval Vessel Register on 1 April 1964 and sold for scrapping in May 1965.

References

 

Crosley-class high speed transports
Ships built in Hingham, Massachusetts
1945 ships